The Myanmar Investment Commission (abbreviated MIC) is a government-appointed body under the Ministry of Investment and Foreign Economic Relations that appraises domestic investment proposals in Myanmar (Burma). MIC was formed in April 1994, after the State Law and Order Restoration Council issued the Myanmar Citizens Investment Law. In 2000, MIC underwent organisational changes to reduce the number of committee members to four and also . MIC also manages the 1988 Foreign Investment Law. The body was re-established in 2016 as an 11-member committee to scrutinise economic proposals.

A new set of reforms (2012) drafted for the Myanmar investment law includes a proposal to transform the Myanmar Investment Commission from a government-appointed body into an independent board. This could bring greater transparency to the process of issuing investment licenses, according to the proposed reforms drafted by experts and senior officials. The current key positions, however, are still held by senior government officials, including ministers and their deputies.

Chairman (2011 - Current)

Organisation
The new commission was formed by SAC Chairman Min Aung Hlaing in 2021.
Moe Myint Tun (Chairman) - member of SAC
Aung Naing Oo (Vice Chairman) - Union minister of Investment and Foreign Economic Relations
Khin Maung Yee (Member) - Union minister of Natural Resources and Environmental Conservation
Dr Thida Oo (Member) - Attorney General
 Nyunt Aung (Member) - Deputy minister of Commerce
 Win Thaw (Member) - Vive chairman of Central Bank
 Kyaw Min Oo (Member) - Permanent Secretary of Ministry of Agriculture, Livestock and Irrigation
 Min Htut (Member) - Director General of Internal Revenue Department (Ministry of Planning and Finance)
 Thant Sin Lwin (Secretary) - Director General of Directorate of Investment & Company Administration (Ministry of Investment and Foreign Economic Relations)

Designation of Development Zone 
The Myanmar Investment Commission (MIC) designated 3 development zones on 22 February 2017 in purposes of income tax exemption and relief. The established zone 1, 2 and 3 refers to the less developed regions, moderate developed regions and developed regions, respectively. The investment in the designed zone 1 ,which is the less developed regions, will receive tax exemption for 7 years. There is a 5 years of tax exemption for the moderated developed regions, and 3 years for the developed regions. The classification of zones are defined based on the township administrative division. The classification of zone can be updated periodically based on the notification from the MIC. For example, 13 among 45 townships of Yangon region ( Dala, Dawmu, Thongwa, etc.) are designed as moderated developed zone and other townships falls into developed zone. It is notable that the township of Dawei Special Economic Zone, the third established SEZ of Myanmar is designed to zone 1 as the less develop regions.

Zone 1: Less Developed Regions

Zone 2: Moderate Developed Regions

Zone 3: Developed Regions

References

4.Taipei American Chamber of Commerce; Topics Magazine, Analysis, November 2012. "Myanmar: Southeast Asia's Last Frontier for Investment: 

Government agencies of Myanmar
Finance in Myanmar
1994 establishments in Myanmar
Investment promotion agencies